The Maritime Secretary of Pakistan, also referred to as Ports and Shipping Secretary, is the Federal Secretary for the Ministry of Maritime Affairs. The position holder is a BPS-22 grade officer, usually belonging to the Pakistan Administrative Service. The Maritime Secretary is considered to be a coveted slot in the Government of Pakistan, with major organisations such as the Pakistan National Shipping Corporation (PNSC), Karachi Port Trust (KPT), Port Qasim Authority (PQA) and Gwadar Port Authority (GPA) as well as the country's deep sea fishing between the territorial waters base line and the outermost limits of the exclusive economic zone falling under the Secretary's purview.

The slot of Maritime Secretary is vacant, with the position being currently looked after by Tariq Huda in addition to his other duties. Previous maritime secretaries include Rizwan Ahmed, Mumtaz Ali Shah, Fazalur Rehman and Babar Yaqoob Fateh Muhammad.

The Pakistan Marine Academy, Marine Fisheries Department, Korangi Fish Harbour, Government Shipping Office and Mercantile Marine Department also come under the administrative control of the Maritime Secretary.

See also
Planning and Development Secretary of Pakistan
Finance Secretary of Pakistan
Petroleum Secretary of Pakistan
Commerce Secretary of Pakistan

References

Ministry of Maritime Affairs (Pakistan)